Rostroclytus is a genus of beetles in the family Cerambycidae, containing the following species:

 Rostroclytus capixaba (Napp & Monne, 2006)
 Rostroclytus rondonianus (Napp & Monne, 2006)
 Rostroclytus turuna (Galileo & Martins, 2007)

References

Clytini